is a train station located in Takatori, Takaichi District, Nara Prefecture, Japan.

Lines 
 Kintetsu Railway
 Yoshino Line

Platforms and tracks

External links

References

Railway stations in Japan opened in 1923
Stations of Kintetsu Railway
Railway stations in Nara Prefecture